Type LR66 radar is a Chinese fire control radar or Type 349 for Type 730 CIWS developed by the 20th Research Institute of China Electronics Technology Group Corporation (CETGC, 中国电子科技集团公司第二十研究所), also known as Xi’an Research Institute of Navigation Technology (西安导航技术研究所).

Developed as one of the latest member of Type 347/Type 348/Type 349/LR66 series, LR66 radar is designed to control both CIWS of smaller caliber and the main gun of larger caliber. The system is very compact, needing only two cabinets, and a single operator console. LR66 fire control radar is connected to search radar via Ethernet. Specification:
Band: X or J band
Probability of kill: 90%
Range (km) against target with radar cross section of 2 square meters: > 18
Range (km) against target with radar cross section of 0.1 square meters: > 9
Maximum effective altitude (km): 15
Frequency agile band (GHz): > 2
Azimuth accuracy (rmad): 1.2
Elevation accuracy (rmd): 1.2
Range accuracy (m): 5

See also
Chinese radars
Naval Weaponry of the People's Liberation Army Navy

References

Sea radars
Military radars of the People's Republic of China